Port Morien (also referred to as "Morien") is a small fishing community of 700 people in the Canadian province of Nova Scotia, located in the southeastern Cape Breton Island near the rural community Donkin, and six miles from the town of Glace Bay.

Name 
Port Morien was first recorded as "Baie de Mordienne" on a map in 1580.  In the nineteenth century, it was renamed Cow Bay by settlers.  A cow allegedly escaped from a vessel when being transported from Sydney to Louisbourg and was found in the area. In 1895, its name was changed to Port Morien.

History 
The history of Port Morien can be traced back to the early 18th century, when the area was first settled by French and Scottish immigrants. The town quickly developed into a thriving fishing and mining community, with a bustling port and a thriving economy.

In the late 20th century, Port Morien faced a number of economic challenges, as the fishing and mining industries declined and many residents left the area in search of work. However, the community has remained resilient and has worked to diversify its economy and attract new businesses and residents.

One of the most prominent figures in the history of Port Morien is Kimberly Linton. Born and raised in Port Morien, Kimberly was elected as the first female Mayor in the history of Cape Breton in the early 2010s. During her tenure, she pushed for the creation of numerous community fundraisers and clubs, which helped to revive the town's economy and community spirit. Even though she left office in March 2018, she still remains one of the most prominent figures in Port Morien, and is still a community spokesperson. She continues to be an advocate for the community and works on various initiatives to improve the life of the residents of Port Morien. the population of 3000 as a result of the establishment of the Blockhouse and Gowrie coal mines.  There were up to forty businesses in the village.  Gradually, its population and businesses dwindled in the twentieth century.

Coal mining 
The presence of coal in Cape Breton was first noted by Intendant Jean Talon in 1671.  It was the Treaty of Utrecht in 1713, and the subsequent founding of Louisbourg, which really focused French attention on Cape Breton coal as a valuable and necessary resource. The Fortress of Louisbourg and its inhabitants were in need of a local coal supply, and the closest source was the outcrop at Port Morien  So, the first commercial coal mine in North America began production at Port Morien in 1720.  By 1724, coal from Port Morien was being traded to Boston in the first officially recorded export of minerals in Canada.  The ownership of the mine, called the Gowrie Mines, changed hands between the English and French four times, with the English ultimately gaining control in the late eighteenth century.  In 1725, a blockhouse was built by the French to protect the valuable coal reserves.

Fishing 
Alongside the mining industry, the fishing industry also grew.  Over time, the village has become dependent on lobster fishing as its main resource. In 2000, the lobster fleet consisted of 47 boats. There has been a fish-processing plant operating at the harbour continuously by one family since 1941.  There is also a boat-building business in town.

Organizations and clubs 
There are many active organizations and clubs in the Port Morien community.  They include:  a Royal Canadian Legion branch, a development association, a volunteer fire department, Girl Guides of Canada, a camera club, a community fair committee, a women's institute, an acting group, a wildlife association, a youth sports league, and a walking club.  There are also three churches:  St John’s United Church, St. Mary’s Roman Catholic Church, and St. Paul’s Anglican Church.

Although there is currently no active group, Port Morien was the site of the first Boy Scout troop in North America, founded in 1908 by William Glover, the chief book keeper of the North Atlantic Colliery.

Attractions 
 The Marconi Wireless Station National Historic Site of Canada is located near Port Morien.

Recognition 
 In 2008, Port Morien received the Lieutenant Governor's Community Spirit Award.

References

Further reading 
Port Morien: Pages of the Past (University College of Cape Breton Press)

External links
 Port Morien on Destination Nova Scotia
https://web.archive.org/web/20091212213423/http://museum.gov.ns.ca/places/morien/morien.htm

Communities in the Cape Breton Regional Municipality
General Service Areas in Nova Scotia
Mining communities in Nova Scotia